Disney's Fairy Tale Weddings is a documentary television series featuring couples and their Disney-themed weddings, airing on Disney's Freeform network and the Disney+ streaming service.

Synopsis
The show provides a behind-the-scenes look at the weddings and engagements of couples that take place at Disney destinations including Walt Disney World, Disneyland, Disney Cruise Line, and at Aulani in Hawaii. It is coordinated by Disney's Fairy Tale Weddings.

Release
A Disney's Fairy Tale Weddings 90–minute special was announced on March 29, 2017. The special was broadcast via Freeform on May 7, 2017. The special was hosted by Ben Higgins and Lauren Bushnell from The Bachelor. On October 17, 2017, Freeform announced the production of a seven-episode series for Summer 2018 to be hosted by Allison Holker and Stephen "tWitch" Boss. In November 2017, Freeform added a December 11, 2017 hour-long special, Disney's Fair Tale Weddings: Holiday Magic as part of its 25 Days of Christmas event. The series premiered on June 11, 2018. The first season concluded on July 16, 2018.

The second season premiered on Disney+ on February 14, 2020.

Episodes

Specials (2017)

Season 1 (2018)

Season 2 (2020)

References

External links
Official website 
 
 

2010s American documentary television series
2017 American television series debuts
2020 American television series endings
Disney+ original programming
Documentaries about weddings
English-language television shows
Freeform (TV channel) original programming
Television series by Disney–ABC Domestic Television
Wedding television shows
Television shows filmed in Alaska
Television shows filmed in the Bahamas
Television shows filmed in California
Television shows filmed in Florida
Television shows filmed in France
Television shows filmed in Hawaii